60,000 (sixty thousand) is the natural number that comes after 59,999 and before 60,001. It is a round number. It is the value of (F25).

Selected numbers in the range 60,000–69,999

60,001 to 60,999
 60,049 = Leyland number
 60,101 = smallest prime with period of reciprocal 100

61,000 to 61,999

62,000 to 62,999
 62,208 = 3-smooth number
 62,210 = Markov number
 62,745 = Carmichael number

63,000 to 63,999
 63,020 = amicable number with 76084
 63,360 = inches in a mile
 63,600 = number of free 12-ominoes
 63,750 = pentagonal pyramidal number
 63,973 = Carmichael number

64,000 to 64,999
 64,000 = 403; also 64,000 Dollar Question
 64,009 = sum of the cubes of the first 22 positive integers
 64,079 = Lucas number
 64,442 = Number of integer degree intersections on Earth: 360 longitudes * 179 latitudes + 2 poles = 64442.

65,000 to 65,999
 65,025 = 2552, palindromic in base 11 (4494411)
 65,279 = Unicode code point for byte order mark
 65,534 = Unicode code point guaranteed not to be a character
 65,535 = largest value for an unsigned 16-bit integer on a computer.
 65,536 = 216, also 2↑↑4 using Knuth's up-arrow notation, smallest integer with exactly 17 divisors, palindromic in base 15 (1464115), number of directed graphs on 4 labeled nodes
 65,537 = largest known Fermat prime
 65,539 = the 6544th prime number, and both 6544 and 65539 have digital root of 1; a regular prime; a larger member of a twin prime pair; a smaller member of a cousin prime pair; a happy prime; a weak prime; a middle member of a prime triplet, (65537,	65539,	65543); a middle member of a three-term primes in arithmetic progression, (65521,	65539,	65557).
 65,792 = Leyland number

66,000 to 66,999
 66,012 = tribonacci number
 66,049 = 2572, palindromic in hexadecimal (1020116)
 66,198 = Giuga number
 66,666 = repdigit

67,000 to 67,999
 67,081 = 2592, palindromic in base 6 (12343216)
 67,171 = 16 + 26 + 36 + 46 + 56 + 66
 67,607 = largest of five remaining Seventeen or Bust numbers in the Sierpiński problem
 67,626 = pentagonal pyramidal number

68,000 to 68,999
 68,000 = Motorola 68000, a processor used in Apple Macintosh computers before PowerPC (also 68k processor family)
 68,008 = Motorola 68008, a processor used in Sinclair QL computer
 68,020 = Motorola 68020, a processor used in Apple Macintosh computers before PowerPC
 68,030 = Motorola 68030, a processor used in Apple Macintosh computers before PowerPC
 68,040 = Motorola 68040, a processor used in Apple Macintosh computers before PowerPC
 68,881 = Motorola 68881, a math coprocessor used in with 68020 and 68030
 68,882 = Motorola 68882, a math coprocessor used in with 68020 and 68030
 68,921 =  413

69,000 to 69,999
 69,105 = Infocom in-joke
 69,632 = Leyland number
 69,696 = square of 264; only known palindromic square that can be expressed as the sum of a pair of twin primes: 69,696 = 34847 + 34849.
 69,984 = 3-smooth number

References

60000